The  (GP) was a French Maoist  political party which existed from 1968 to 1974. As Christophe Bourseiller has put it, "Of all the Maoist organizations after May 1968, the most important numerically as well as in cultural influence was without question the Gauche prolétarienne".

History 
The GP was formed in October 1968. In 1969 the former student union leaders Alain Geismar and Serge July joined the group.

Several members of the group were involved with the founding of the French daily  which evolved into a centre left mainstream mass circulation daily newspaper.

The group was also known as "Mao-Spontex", or Maoist-spontaneists. The connection to Spontex, a cleaning sponge brand, was intended as a pejorative to disparage the GP's antiauthoritarianism approach to revolution.

Prominent people who were at one point members of the GP include Serge July, Olivier Rolin, Frédéric H. Fajardie, Gérard Miller, Jean-Claude Milner, Marin Karmitz, André Glucksmann, Gilles Susong, Christian Jambet, Guy Lardreau, Daniel Rondeau, Olivier Roy, Judith Miller, Dominique Grange and Gilles Millet. A group of former members became core members of the New Philosophers in the 1970s.

See also 
 The French autonome movement
 Murder of Pierre Overney
 Armed Nuclei for Popular Autonomy

References

External links 
 Maoism in France in the 1970′s
 History of the Gauche prolétarienne

1968 establishments in France
1974 disestablishments in France
Communist parties in France
Defunct political parties in France
Maoist organizations in France
New Philosophers
Political parties established in 1968
Political parties disestablished in 1974